I Don't Want You Back is the debut album by American R&B singer Eamon, released in the United States on February 17, 2004. Produced by Milk Dee and Roy "Royalty" Hamilton, the album spawned two singles which combined modern hip hop with classic doo wop: "Fuck It (I Don't Want You Back)" and "I Love Them Ho's (Ho-Wop)". The album garnered a mixed reception from critics who found the production too predictable and the repeated profanity wearing. The album debuted at number seven on the Billboard 200 with first-week sales of 106,000 copies. It was certified Gold by the RIAA for selling over 500,000 copies.

Reception

Critical reception

I Don't Want You Back received generally mixed reviews from music critics who found the production by-the-numbers and felt that his potty-mouth gimmick wore thin. Johnny Loftus of AllMusic found a lot of filler in the album but said that it is "still quite promising, especially with such a statement-making single." Entertainment.ie was mixed about the album's tracks with their depiction of women, concluding that "Eamon certainly has plenty of attitude and his album is undeniably good fun. But he also has a bit of growing up to do." Rob Kemp of Rolling Stone said he saw promise in Eamon through the album's competent R&B production and the track "I Love Them Ho's (Ho-Wop)," concluding that "you wonder if this modestly gifted kid has something special inside him that perhaps Kanye West or R. Kelly could coax out."

Sal Cinquemani of Slant Magazine found Eamon's talent on the album limited, saying that the tracks that don't mix his dirty mouth with Motown and doo-wop melodies aren't "clever or well-constructed enough to transcend the misogyny and double-standards put on whorish display." Despite praising Eamon's vocals, the album's beats and guest rap appearances, Caroline Sullivan of The Guardian found the swearing crooner gimmick throughout the album wearing thin before it even ended. Robert Christgau graded the album as a "dud", indicating "a bad record whose details rarely merit further thought." Elysa Gardner of USA Today criticized the album for its lack of humor or irony throughout the tracklist, saying that "Eamon makes Eminem look like a standard-bearer for feminists."

Commercial performance
The album debuted at number seven on the Billboard 200 with first-week sales of 106,000 copies. It dropped to number nine in its second week with sales dropping 31% to 73,000 copies. It was certified Gold by the RIAA and has sold 591,000 copies as of June 2006.

Track listing

 (*) Denotes co-producer.

Sample credits
"I Love Them Ho's (Ho-Wop)", samples "I Only Have Eyes For You" performed by The Flamingos, and written by Al Dubin and Harry Warren.
"My Baby's Lost", samples "Top Billin'" performed by Audio Two, and written by Kirk Robinson.
"I'd Rather Fuck with You", samples "I'd Rather Be With You" performed by Bootsy Collins, and written by Bootsy Collins, George Clinton Jr. and Gary Cooper and "I'd Rather Fuck You" performed by N.W.A., and written by Eazy-E.

Personnel
Adapted from the I Don't Want You Back liner notes.

 Nat Robinson: executive producer
 Dave Kutch: mastering
 Crissy Gomez: make up artist
 Michelle 10: styling
 Anthony Cutajar: Milk Dee image
 Daniel Hastings: photography, art direction and graphic design

Charts

Weekly charts

Year-end charts

Certifications

References

2004 debut albums
Eamon (singer) albums
Jive Records albums